Maritta Becker (born 11 March 1981 in Heilbronn, West Germany) is a German ice hockey forward and coach.

International career

Becker was selected for the Germany women's national ice hockey team in the 2002, 2006 and 2014 Winter Olympics. In 2002, she led the team in scoring, with three goals and two assists. In 2006, she again led the team, with the same point totals. In 2014, she had one assist in five games.

Becker also played for Germany in the qualifying event for the 2010 Winter Olympics and the 2006 qualifying.

As of 2014, Becker has also appeared for Germany at eight IIHF Women's World Championships. Her first appearance came in 1999.

Becker has also served as an assistant coach of the women's national team, at the 2012, and as a head coach of the Germany women's national under-18 ice hockey team, at the IIHF World Women's U18 Championships in 2012 and 2013

Career statistics

International career
Through 2013-14 season

References

External links
Eurohockey.com Profile

1981 births
Sportspeople from Heilbronn
Living people
Olympic ice hockey players of Germany
Ice hockey players at the 2002 Winter Olympics
Ice hockey players at the 2006 Winter Olympics
Ice hockey players at the 2014 Winter Olympics
German women's ice hockey forwards
AIK IF players
HC Lugano players